The Customs Convention on Containers is a United Nations and International Maritime Organization treaty whereby states agree to allow intermodal containers to be temporarily brought into their states duty- and tax-free.

The original Convention was concluded in Geneva on 18 May 1956 and entered into force on 4 August 1959. On 2 December 1972, a new Convention was concluded with the provision that when it entered into force, it would replace the 1956 Convention for the parties that ratify it. The 1972 Convention entered into force on 6 December 1975. The 1956 Convention was ratified by 44 states; as of 2016, the 1972 Convention has been ratified by 40 states. The International Container Bureau was instrumental in the creation of the revised 1972 Convention.

The Convention allows for shipping containers to be brought from a ratifying state into a ratifying state duty- and tax-free for a period of three months.

The Convention was concluded at the same conference that concluded the Customs Convention on the Temporary Importation of Commercial Road Vehicles, the Customs Convention on the Temporary Importation for Private Use of Aircraft and Pleasure Boats, and the CMR Convention.

The Convention was somewhat superseded in 1990 by the Istanbul Convention, which combines in one single instrument the various conventions on the temporary admission of specific goods.

See also
ATA Carnet

External links
Text of 1972 Convention
Ratification status of 1956 Convention
Ratification status of 1972 Convention
Customs Convention on Containers Handbook, World Customs Organization

International Maritime Organization treaties
United Nations treaties
Customs treaties
Transport treaties
Intermodal transport
1956 in Switzerland
1972 in Switzerland
1956 in transport
1972 in transport
Treaties concluded in 1956
Treaties concluded in 1972
Treaties entered into force in 1959
Treaties entered into force in 1975
Treaties of Algeria
Treaties of Antigua and Barbuda
Treaties of Australia
Treaties of Austria
Treaties of Belgium
Treaties of Bosnia and Herzegovina
Treaties of the People's Republic of Bulgaria
Treaties of the Kingdom of Cambodia (1953–1970)
Treaties of Cameroon
Treaties of Canada
Treaties of Croatia
Treaties of Cuba
Treaties of the Czech Republic
Treaties of Czechoslovakia
Treaties of Finland
Treaties of France
Treaties of West Germany
Treaties of Denmark
Treaties of the Kingdom of Greece
Treaties of the Hungarian People's Republic
Treaties of Ireland
Treaties of Israel
Treaties of Italy
Treaties of Jamaica
Treaties of Japan
Treaties of Luxembourg
Treaties of Malawi
Treaties of Mauritius
Treaties of Moldova
Treaties of Montenegro
Treaties of the Netherlands
Treaties of Norway
Treaties of the Polish People's Republic
Treaties of the Estado Novo (Portugal)
Treaties of the Socialist Republic of Romania
Treaties of Serbia and Montenegro
Treaties of Sierra Leone
Treaties of Slovakia
Treaties of Slovenia
Treaties of the Solomon Islands
Treaties of Francoist Spain
Treaties of Sweden
Treaties of Switzerland
Treaties of Trinidad and Tobago
Treaties of the United Kingdom
Treaties of the United States
Treaties of Yugoslavia
Treaties of Armenia
Treaties of Azerbaijan
Treaties of the Byelorussian Soviet Socialist Republic
Treaties of Burundi
Treaties of the People's Republic of China
Treaties of Georgia (country)
Treaties of Indonesia
Treaties of Kazakhstan
Treaties of Kyrgyzstan
Treaties of Lebanon
Treaties of Liberia
Treaties of Lithuania
Treaties of Morocco
Treaties of New Zealand
Treaties of South Korea
Treaties of the Soviet Union
Treaties of Saudi Arabia
Treaties of Tunisia
Treaties of Turkey
Treaties of the Ukrainian Soviet Socialist Republic
Treaties of Uzbekistan
Treaties of Liechtenstein
Treaties of East Germany
Treaties extended to Puerto Rico
Treaties extended to the Territory of Papua and New Guinea
Treaties extended to Norfolk Island
Treaties extended to Christmas Island
Treaties extended to the Cocos (Keeling) Islands
Treaties extended to the Netherlands Antilles
Treaties extended to Aruba
Treaties extended to Netherlands New Guinea
Treaties extended to the Isle of Man
Treaties extended to Guernsey
Treaties extended to Jersey
Treaties extended to the West Indies Federation
Treaties extended to Bermuda
Treaties extended to the British Solomon Islands
Treaties extended to Brunei (protectorate)
Treaties extended to British Cyprus
Treaties extended to the Falkland Islands
Treaties extended to the Gambia Colony and Protectorate
Treaties extended to Gibraltar
Treaties extended to the Gilbert and Ellice Islands
Treaties extended to British Mauritius
Treaties extended to the Colony of North Borneo
Treaties extended to the Colony of Sarawak
Treaties extended to the Colony of Sierra Leone
Treaties extended to the Crown Colony of Singapore
Treaties extended to the Sultanate of Zanzibar
Treaties extended to British Hong Kong
Treaties extended to West Berlin
Treaties extended to Liechtenstein